Cloacibacillus porcorum is a Gram-negative, anaerobic, mesophilic and non-motile bacterium from the genus of Cloacibacillus which has been isolated from the intestinal tract of a pig from Ames in the United States.

References

Bacteria described in 2013
Synergistota